Sibi Pulpally is a photographer from Kerala, India. In 2009, he won the Kerala Lalithakala Academy Award for his photo Kaalukal urangunnilla (English: Legs never sleep). He worked as the researcher and one of the producer of documentary Have You Seen Arana? which has won several awards internationally. He also worked as the still photographer for the film Guda, the first film in the tribal language of the Kattunaikkars.

Personal life 
Sibi Pulpally was born in Pulpally, Wayanad district. He runs a photography studio called Sibees Studio in Pulpally.

Awards 
 Kerala Lalithakala Academy Award 2009
 Kerala State Photography Award 2019: Consolation Prize
 Kodamana Satyanath Photography Award by Premji Smaraka Samiti
 Victor George Award

Solo exhibitions 
 Sthree jeevitam (English:Women's Life): Lalithakala Academy Art Gallery, Mananthavadi, Wayanad

References

External links 
 ഒറ്റ ഫ്രെയിമിലെ ചിന്ത എന്ന വെല്ലുവിളി (English meaning:The Challenge of Thought in a Frame): An article by Siby Pulpally (Language: Malayayalam)

Living people
Photographers from Kerala
1973 births